Alaigal is a 1973 Indian Tamil-language film written, produced and directed by Sridhar. The film, released on 13 January 1973, stars Vishnuvardhan and Chandrakala. It was the first Tamil film of Vishnuvardhan.

Plot

Cast 
 Vishnuvardhan as Inspector Raju
 Chandrakala as Lakshmi
 Cho
 Manorama as Nalina
 Dhulipala
 Selvakumar
 Thengai Srinivasan
 Suruli Rajan
 Rama Rao
 Typist Gopu
 Sundari Bai
 Kumudhini
 Seethalakshmi

Production 
After the average response to his previous film Avalukendru Or Manam (1971), Sridhar decided to make a Tamil-Telugu bilingual titled Thulasi with A. V. M. Rajan starring in Tamil and Sobhan Babu in Telugu. Sridhar developed a story from the Hindi film Aadmi (1939) and the American film Waterloo Bridge (1931), retaining only the basic premise. However after canning , he decided to drop the film, uncertain whether the audience would accept a film with anti-sentimental elements. Sridhar restarted the same film with changes in the script and cast. The title was changed to Alaigal, with Kannada actor Vishnuvardhan in the lead which marked his debut in Tamil cinema.

Soundtrack 
The music was composed by M. S. Viswanathan, while the lyrics were written by Kannadasan.

Release and reception 
Alaigal was released on 13 January 1973. Kumudham called the story ordinary, criticising it for lack of originality. Kalki praised Sridhar for directing a film with a different kind of plot without including any cinematic elements. However the film failed at the box office.

References

External links 
 

1970s Tamil-language films
1973 films
Films directed by C. V. Sridhar
Films scored by M. S. Viswanathan
Films with screenplays by C. V. Sridhar
Indian black-and-white films
Indian police films